The Xinlong Formation (sometimes called the "Napai Formation", or misspelt as "Napan Formation") is an Early Cretaceous geologic formation in Guangxi, southern China.

Dinosaur remains diagnostic to the genus level are among the fossils that have been recovered from the formation.

Vertebrate paleofauna

Dinosaurs

See also 
 List of dinosaur-bearing rock formations
 List of stratigraphic units with few dinosaur genera

References

Bibliography 
  

Geologic formations of China
Lower Cretaceous Series of Asia
Cretaceous China
Albian Stage
Aptian Stage
Sandstone formations
Mudstone formations
Fluvial deposits
Lacustrine deposits
Paleontology in Guangxi